Mary Ann Hall (1814 or 1815 – January 29, 1886) ran a successful brothel from the 1840s until about 1878 at 349 Maryland Avenue SW, Washington, D.C., about four blocks west of the U.S. Capitol. Before the National Museum of the American Indian was built on the site in 1999, the Smithsonian Institution conducted an archeological excavation of the foundations and garbage dump of the house.

The expensive tableware in the garbage dump was made of ironstone and porcelain. Food remnants include meat, fowl, fish, and exotic fruits like coconuts and berries. French champagne corks were especially numerous.
She built a three-story house on the site which rose greatly in value.
Her business was apparently very successful and she died with a net worth of $87,000 - worth over $2,000,000 in 2005 dollars.

In 1864 the Union Army's Provost Marshal published a list of brothels in Washington and Mary Ann Hall's had 18 "inmates," making it the largest in the city.

She was buried with her sister and other family members under "large and dignified" memorials at the Congressional Cemetery in Washington, D.C.

Her summer home in Arlington was later owned by Presley Marion Rixey and is now Marymount University.

References

Further reading
Donna J. Seifert and Joseph Balicki, Mary Ann Hall's House, Historical Archeology, 2005, pp. 59–73.
Madam on the Mall, Smithsonian Institution, accessed March 15, 2016.
Archaeological Investigations National Museum of the American Indian Site Washington, D.C., 1997, accessed May 25, 2012.

External links

Congressional Cemetery, obituary and newspaper articles.
Mary Ann Hall's Brothel

1810s births
1886 deaths
19th-century American businesspeople
19th-century American businesswomen
American brothel owners and madams
People from Washington, D.C.
Burials at the Congressional Cemetery
Year of birth uncertain